Mill Branch may refer to:

Mill Branch (Tussocky Branch tributary), a stream in Sussex County, Delaware
Mill Branch (Marshyhope Creek tributary), a stream in Dorchester County, Maryland
Mill Branch (Patuxent River), a stream in Maryland
Mill Branch (Clear Creek), a stream in Missouri
Mill Branch (Duck River), a stream in Tennessee
Mill Branch (Cacapon River), a stream in West Virginia

See also
Mill Branch site